Marcel Jean (1900 in La Charité-sur-Loire, France - 4 December 1993 in Louveciennes, France) was a French painter, writer, and sculptor who joined the surrealist movement in 1933.

He is perhaps best known for his trompe l'oeil painting Armoire Surrealiste now in the permanent collection of the Musée des Arts Décoratifs, Paris. 
His work is also in the Peggy Guggenheim Collection and that of MoMA in New York City.

He authored two books on the history of Surrealism, Surrealism Histoire de la Peinture Surréaliste and L’Autobiographie du Surréalisme.

References

20th-century French painters
French sculptors
Surrealism
1900 births
1993 deaths